Adam Hartlett (born 22 April 1986) is an Australian rules footballer who played for Carlton in the Australian Football League (AFL).

After graduating from Sacred Heart College in 2003, Hartlett was recruited as the number 25 draft pick in the 2004 AFL draft from West Adelaide by the Carlton Football Club. Hartlett played for Carlton's , the Northern Bullants, in both reserves and seniors through 2005 and 2006, suffering several injury setbacks. Following strong performances with the Bullants seniors in early 2007, he made his debut for Carlton in Round 9. He was a member of the Bullants' losing grand final team in 2009. His brother Hamish, currently plays for Port Adelaide.

Hartlett has played both back and forward in key positions, both with the Bullants and Blues. However, his development and career were hampered by recurring hamstring injuries. He was delisted by the Blues at the end of the 2009 season , and returned to West Adelaide in 2010, where he is still playing as of 2014.

References

External links
Adam Hartlett at the Carlton Football Club website

Adam Hartlett profile in Blueseum

1986 births
Carlton Football Club players
West Adelaide Football Club players
Preston Football Club (VFA) players
Australian rules footballers from South Australia
Living people
People educated at Sacred Heart College, Adelaide